Connable is a surname. Notable people with the surname include:

Ben Connable, American military strategist 
Joel Connable (1973–2012), American television host, news anchor, and reporter